Rudolf "Rudi" Dassler (26 March 1898 – 27 October 1974) was a German cobbler, businessman, a member of the Nazi party and also the founder of the sportswear company Puma. 

He was the older brother of Adidas founder, Adolf "Adi" Dassler. The brothers were partners in a shoe company Adolf started, . Rudolf joined in 1924. However, after a feud developed between them following World War II, the brothers went separate ways and started their respective companies in 1948.

Initially calling the new company "Ruda" (an acronym for Rudolf Dassler), it was soon changed to its present name of Puma. Puma is the native Quechua word for cougar; from there, it went into German as well as other languages.

Life
After his return from World War I, Adolf Dassler, Rudolf's younger brother, started to produce sports shoes in his mother's kitchen. His father, Christoph, who worked in a shoe factory, and the brothers Zehlein, who produced the handmade spikes for track shoes in their blacksmith's shop, supported Adolf in starting his own business. In 1924, Rudolf joined the business, which became the Gebrüder Dassler Schuhfabrik (Dassler Brothers Shoe Factory).

With the rise of Adolf Hitler in the 1930s, both Dassler brothers joined the Nazi Party, with Rudolf reputed as being the more ardent Nazi.

During the war, a growing rift between the pair reached a breaking point after an Allied bomb attack in 1943 when Adi and his wife climbed into a bomb shelter that Rudolf and his family were already in: "The dirty bastards are back again," Adi said, apparently referring to the Allied war planes, but Rudolf was convinced his brother meant him and his family. Rudolf, upon his capture by American troops, was suspected of being a member of the SS, information Rudolf assumed was  allegedly supplied by Adolf.

Under his direction, Puma remained a small provincial company. Only under the direction of his son, Armin Dassler, did it become the worldwide known company it remains today.

Death
Rudi Dassler died on 27 October 1974 of lung cancer at the age of 76.

See also
German inventors and discoverers

References

External links
 Brozzas.de – biography – Rudolf Dassler
 
 Which two brands were founded by rival brothers? 

1898 births
1974 deaths
Rudolf
People from Herzogenaurach
German billionaires
German company founders
20th-century German businesspeople
Shoe designers
German military personnel of World War II
Nazi Party members
People from the Kingdom of Bavaria
Deaths from lung cancer
Adidas people
Puma (brand)
Officers Crosses of the Order of Merit of the Federal Republic of Germany
German military personnel of World War I
National Socialist Motor Corps members